The German Quarterly is a quarterly peer-reviewed academic journal published by Wiley-Blackwell on behalf of the American Association of Teachers of German dedicated to German studies. The coeditors-in-chief are Hester Baer (University of Maryland) and Karin Schutjer (University of Oklahoma). Established in 1928, it is published under the auspices of the American Association of Teachers of German. It has been called "one of the most widely and internationally read American journals in the field of German studies."

Beginning in 2023, The German Quarterly will be available online only.

Abstracting and indexing 
The journal is abstracted and indexed in:

References

External links 
 

Wiley-Blackwell academic journals
Publications established in 1928
English-language journals
Quarterly journals
Germanic philology journals